Gülməmmədli (also, Gul’mamedly, Gyul’mamedli, and Gyul’mamedly) is a village and municipality in the Jalilabad Rayon of Azerbaijan.  It has a population of 2,442.

References 

Populated places in Jalilabad District (Azerbaijan)